The George B. Swan House is a historic building located on the east side of Davenport, Iowa, United States. It has been listed on the National Register of Historic Places since 1983.

History
George B. Swan was the yardmaster for the Chicago, Rock Island and Pacific Railroad. Their roundhouse and switching yards were located down Farnam Street from his house. He had this house constructed in 1881 when the lot was subdivided from the LeClaire family's homestead.

Architecture
The house is a two-story Greek Revival structure with a three-bay front and a front gable. Decorative features such as chamfered posts with small brackets, decorative window surrounds, a diamond-shaped window in the gable end and a two-story projecting side bay make this a Vernacular idiom of the style. A double-leaf door serves as the main entrance into the house.

References

Houses completed in 1881
Greek Revival houses in Iowa
Houses in Davenport, Iowa
Houses on the National Register of Historic Places in Iowa
National Register of Historic Places in Davenport, Iowa
1881 establishments in Iowa